The 1950–51 Drexel Dragons men's basketball team represented Drexel Institute of Technology during the 1950–51 men's basketball season. The Dragons, led by 2nd year head coach Harold Kollar, played their home games at Curtis Hall Gym and were members of the Southern division of the Middle Atlantic Conferences (MAC).

They finished the season 5–12, 3–7 in MAC play to finish in fifth place in the regular season.

Roster

Schedule

|-
!colspan=9 style="background:#F8B800; color:#002663;"| Regular season
|-

References

Drexel Dragons men's basketball seasons
Drexel
1950 in sports in Pennsylvania
1951 in sports in Pennsylvania